Mud Volcanoes State Nature Reserve or in its full name Mud Volcanoes Group of Baku and Absheron Peninsula State Nature Reserve is a state reserve located in the Absheron region of Azerbaijan. The area of ​​the reserve is 12,322.84 hectares and 43 mud volcanoes are protected here. The world's largest mud volcano Toraghay is also protected in this reserve.

History 
The Republic of Azerbaijan is the country with the most widespread mud volcanoes.  Currently, more than 400 mud volcanoes have been registered in the country, which means that half of the world's mud volcanoes are in Azerbaijan. The State Nature Reserve of Mud Volcanoes was established by the Decree of the President of the Republic of Azerbaijan No. 2315 dated August 15, 2007, on the territory of part of the mud volcanoes located on the Baku and Absheron peninsulas. According to the relevant Decree, the main goal of the creation of the State Nature Reserve is the reduction of anthropogenic effects on mud volcanoes, the prevention of intensive construction works in the area and the construction of residential buildings in the zones where volcanoes are likely to erupt. After that, the territory of 43 mud volcanoes in an area of 12,322.84 ha was declared a reserve by Decree No. 294 of the Cabinet of Ministers of the Republic of Azerbaijan dated September 29, 2011.

Activity 
Mainly, two priority directions have been defined in the activity of the reserve:

To carry out the protection of natural areas in order to preserve the natural state of the volcanic landscape, natural complexes and objects.

Organize scientific research and carry out environmental monitoring.

Employees of the reserve maintain the natural state of the volcanic landscape by regularly conducting scientific stationary observations in 43 mud volcanoes with special protection status, forecasting ecological conditions, preparing the scientific basis of nature protection, studying the dynamics of volcanic processes, and also ensuring their protection from anthropogenic interference.

Mud volcanoes in the reserve

See also 
 Mud volcano
 Mud volcanoes in Azerbaijan

References

Protected areas
International Union for Conservation of Nature
National parks of Azerbaijan
Protected areas established in 2007
2007 establishments in Azerbaijan
Ecoregions of Azerbaijan